NGC 4848 is a barred spiral galaxy in the constellation Coma Berenices. It is circa 340 million light-years from Earth, which, given its apparent dimensions, means that NGC 4848 is about 170,000 light years across. It was discovered by Heinrich d'Arrest on April 21, 1865. It is considered part of the Coma Cluster, which is in its northwest part. The galaxy has been stripped of its gas as it passed through the cluster.

Characteristics 
NGC 4848 is a spiral galaxy viewed nearly edge-on that is classified as SBab by de Vaucouleurs. Its nucleus is active, and it has been categorised as an HII region. A number of bright HII regions form a ring around the nucleus with a radius of 5–10 arcseconds.

The galaxy distribution of hydrogen gas is asymmetrical and forms a tail pointing away from the cluster center. The tail was probably formed as a result of ram pressure as the galaxy passed through the Coma Cluster and its intergalactic medium at a speed of about 1,330 km/s, starting 200 million years ago according to Fossati et al., while a previous study indicated a timeline of 400 million years. The lost hydrogen is estimated to comprise two thirds of the original hydrogen content of the galaxy. A few star-forming regions, probably HII regions, are in the tail. 

A dwarf galaxy may cross the disk of NGC 4848; however, its mass is too low to be a source of the hydrogen tail.

See also 
 NGC 4921, a spiral galaxy in the Coma Cluster that has lost its hydrogen

References

External links 

Barred spiral galaxies
Coma Cluster
Coma Berenices
4848
08082
44405